Montenegrins in Slovenia may refer to:

 Montenegrins of Slovenia, an ethnic minority in Slovenia
 Citizens of Montenegro, living or working in Slovenia

See also
 Montenegro-Slovenia relations
 Montenegrins (disambiguation)
 Montenegro (disambiguation)